Paulo Eduardo Lima Martins (born 20 April 1981) is a Brazilian politician and journalist.

He is also a monarchist.

Early life and career

Martins was born on 20 April 1981 in Presidente Venceslau. Prior to his political career, Martins was a journalist. He worked for the network , an affiliate of the Sistema Brasileiro de Televisão. In 2014, his program was taken off the air, as Martins's commentary became critical of Dilma Rousseff. The program was later reinstated.

Political career

As a member of the Brazilian Social Democracy Party, he contested the 2014 Brazilian parliamentary election, receiving 63,970 votes. This vote share placed Martins fourth on a list of alternate deputies.

Martins returned to the Chamber of Deputies in 2018, winning election as a Social Christian Party candidate. He has supported the monarchy of Brazil reclaiming ownership of the Guanabara Palace. In May 2020, Martins posted to Twitter a letter from the Chinese embassy in Brazil addressed to Brazilian deputies, asking them not to acknowledge the second inauguration of Tsai Ing-wen, president of the Republic of China, more commonly known as Taiwan. Martins ignored the suggestion, tweeting "In this letter, the totalitarian Chinese government told the Brazilian Chamber of Deputies and its congresspeople to remain silent about Taiwan's presidential inauguration. This is an affront. Though I am late, I congratulate Tsai Ing-wen on her inauguration." Subsequently #VivaTaiwan trended on Twitter, with responses from other Brazilians, Tsai Ing-wen, and Taiwan's Ministry of Foreign Affairs.

References

1981 births
Living people
Brazilian monarchists
Members of the Chamber of Deputies (Brazil) from Paraná
Brazilian television journalists
Social Christian Party (Brazil) politicians
Brazilian Social Democracy Party politicians
21st-century Brazilian politicians
21st-century journalists